"Love's Gonna Get You Someday" is a song written by Carl Chambers, and recorded by American country music artist Ricky Skaggs.  It was released in September 1986 as the first single from his album Love's Gonna Get Ya!.  The song reached #4 on the Billboard Hot Country Singles chart in December 1986 and #1 on the RPM Country Tracks chart in Canada.

Charts

Weekly charts

Year-end charts

References

1986 singles
1986 songs
Ricky Skaggs songs
Song recordings produced by Ricky Skaggs
Epic Records singles